Esfahanak-e Sofla (also Romanized as Eşfahānak-e Soflá and Eşfahānak Soflá; also known as Esfahanak and Eşfahānak-e Pā’īn) is a village in Chenarud-e Shomali Rural District, Chenarud District, Chadegan County, Isfahan Province, Iran. At the 2006 census, its population was 104, in 21 families.

References 

Populated places in Chadegan County